PFC Victoria London is a football club based in Hanworth, London, England.

History
PFC Victoria London were formed on 1 July 2016, as a club for the Polish community in the United Kingdom. Upon formation, the club joined the Middlesex County League, winning Division Two in their debut season. In the 2017–18 season, PFC Victoria London won Division One (West), gaining promotion to the Middlesex County Premier Division. PFC London Victoria entered the FA Vase for the first time in 2019–20.

Ground
The club currently groundshare with Hanworth Villa at Rectory Meadow.

Honours
Middlesex County League
Division Two champions: 2016–17
Division One (West) champions: 2017–18

Records
Best FA Vase performance: First qualifying round, 2019–20
Record attendance: 350 vs North Acton, Middlesex County League Division One (West), 7 October 2017

References

Polish-British culture
Association football clubs established in 2016
2016 establishments in England
Football clubs in England
Football clubs in London
Sport in the London Borough of Hounslow
Middlesex County Football League
Diaspora sports clubs in the United Kingdom
Polish diaspora in the United Kingdom
Diaspora association football clubs in England